The following is a list of Major League Baseball players, retired or active.

Ta through Th

References

External links
Last Names starting with T – Baseball-Reference.com

 Ta-Th